Dave Meegan is a record producer. He trained under Trevor Horn and is best known for his work with Marillion. Marillion guitarist Steve Rothery has said he admires Meegan's work so much he considers him to be "a sixth member of the band". He also worked for U2 as an engineer during the sessions for The Joshua Tree and Rattle and Hum.

Meegan's association with Marillion began when he worked as an assistant engineer on their second album,  Fugazi.  He later returned to produce their albums Brave, a concept album, and Afraid of Sunlight, which were their final two albums released on EMI in the 1990s. He also produced their 2001 album Anoraknophobia and their 2004 album  Marbles, containing the single "You're Gone" which reached number 7 in the UK Singles Chart, the band's highest-charting single since Steve Hogarth replaced original singer Fish in 1989.

He also produced Slinky, by the Milltown Brothers, and 2 Hell with Common Sense, by Power of Dreams.

More recently, Dave Meegan has worked with Andrew Morris (singer-songwriter) for Imagem Production Music.

References

British record producers
Living people
Year of birth missing (living people)